Aleksi Holmberg is a Finnish professional ice hockey defenceman and kickboxer.

Holmberg has played for HIFK and HPK in Liiga, the top professional ice hockey league in Finland. He was also the captain of HIFK U20 in the Jr. A SM-liiga.

Kickboxing record (incomplete) 

|-style="background:#fbb;"
|2020-02-27
|Loss
|align="left" | Ali Tamouri
|KOK 83 In Helsinki
|Helsinki, Finland
|Decision
|3
|3:00
|-  style="background:#cfc;"
|2019-09-28
|Win
|align="left" | Marko Ranto
|Nordic Open 2019 - Tournament Final
|Copenhagen, Denmark
|TKO
|2
|
|-
|-  style="background:#cfc;"
|2019-09-28
|Win
|align="left" | Mads Juul Andressen
|Nordic Open 2019 - Tournament Semifinal
|Copenhagen, Denmark
|Decision (Majority)
|3
|3:00
|-
|-style="background:#fbb;"
|2019-03-17
|Loss
|align="left" | Tommi Savolainen
|KBSM 2019
|Iisalmi, Finland
|Decision (Split)
|3
|3:00
|-
| colspan=9 | Legend:

References

External links

1987 births
Living people
Diables Rouges de Briançon players
HC Salamat players
HIFK (ice hockey) players
HPK players
Finnish ice hockey defencemen
Finnish male kickboxers
Ice hockey people from Helsinki
21st-century Finnish people